Mariann is a female given name derived from Maria, similar to Marianne, Mariana and Marian. It may refer to:

Mariann Aalda (born 1948), American actress
Mariann Ambrus (1956–2007), Hungarian rower
Mariann Bienz, British molecular biologist
Mariann Birkedal (born 1987), Norwegian beauty queen
Mariann Budde (born 1959), American bishop
Mariann Byerwalter, American businesswoman
Mariann Domonkos, Canadian table tennis player
Mariann Fischer Boel (born 1943), Danish politician
Mariann Gajhede Knudsen (born 1984), Danish footballer
Mariann Horváth (born 1968), Hungarian épée fencer
Mariann Jelinek (born 1942), American organizational theorist
Mariann Mayberry, American actress
Mariann Stratton (born 1945), Director of the United States Navy Nurse Corps
Mariann Thomassen, Norwegian singer
Mariann Ytterberg (born 1941), Swedish politician

See also
Mariann Grammofon, record label

Feminine given names